In mathematics, a Witt ring may be 
A ring of Witt vectors
The Witt ring (forms), a ring structure on the Witt group of symmetric bilinear forms
See also Witt algebra, a Lie algebra.